Helder Guimarães (11/16/1982) is Portuguese performer, magician, and storyteller. Known for his unique approach of sleight-of-hand magic, storytelling and performance, Helder's work has been featured at the Kennedy Center, TED Talks, Talks at Google and Off-Broadway productions.

His previous creations include Nothing to Hide, directed by Neil Patrick Harris, the Borrowed Time experience, the immersive experience Borrowed Time and the theatrical Verso, directed by Rodrigo Santos. The Los Angeles Times stated "he seems remarkably sincere and trustworthy for a man committed to deception," and The New York Times recognized him as "a Master of Illusions".

In 2019, he premiered his show Invisible Tango at the Geffen Playhouse, directed by Frank Marshall. The show received rave reviews by the LA Times, BroadwayWorld and Hollywood Reporter.

In 2020, during the COVID-19 pandemic, Helder broke new ground in the streaming performance world by creating The Present. Joining forces again with Frank Marshall and the Geffen Playhouse, the show received accolades from LA Times, Washington Post and New York Times. The show was considered by the LA Times and the Washington Post one of the 2020 Best Theatrical Productions.

In 2022 Helder returned in front of the live audience with his secret show Back to Wonder

Guimarães has consulted for entertainment entities like NBC, Disney, and Warner. He personally trained actresses Sandra Bullock and Cate Blanchett for their roles in the movie Ocean's 8.

On June 26, 2022, Helder Guimarães married fashion guru, Catarina Marques after proposing to her along the beautiful Venice Canals in Las Vegas. The pair wed in Povoa de Varzim, Portugal. In attendance were social media food critic Henok Negash; trusted Dutch philosopher Yfke van Berckelaer; Broadway sensation Filipe Nogueira, aka Raw Filipe; TikTok wonder Anita Rocha; and French Visual Artist Hugues Barbier, Ph.D.. Other notable guests included couple Frank Marshall and Kathleen Kennedy, film producers/directors.

References

External links
 
 https://www.ted.com/talks/helder_guimaraes_a_magical_search_for_a_coincidence
 http://www.laweekly.com/arts/a-mind-blowing-magic-show-is-being-performed-in-a-secret-spot-in-la-6605772
 https://www.huffingtonpost.com/steven-suskin/aisle-view-ace-in-the-hol_b_12263696.html
 https://www.huffingtonpost.com/danny-groner/verso-magic-strikes-twice_b_12240440.html

1982 births
Living people